Spirit Fiction is a sixth solo album by jazz saxophonist Ravi Coltrane, released on July 19, 2012. His solo on the track "Cross Roads" was nominated for the Grammy Award for Best Improvised Jazz Solo for the 2013 ceremony.

Track listing
All compositions by Ravi Coltrane, except where noted
"Roads Cross" (Ravi Coltrane, Drew Gress, Luis Perdomo, and E. J. Strickland) – 5:04
"Klepto" (Ralph Alessi) – 7:30
"Spirit Fiction" (Coltrane, Gress, Perdomo, and Strickland) – 2:28
"The Change, My Girl" – 6:46
"Who Wants Ice Cream" (Alessi) – 6:32
"Spring & Hudson" – 2:21
"Cross Roads" (Coltrane, Gress, Perdomo, and Strickland) – 4:03
"Yellow Cat" (Alessi) – 6:50
"Check Out Time" (Ornette Coleman) – 7:26
"Fantasm" (Paul Motian) – 4:11
"Marilyn & Tammy" – 5:42

Personnel
Musicians
Ravi Coltrane – mixing, production, soprano and tenor saxophone
Ralph Alessi – trumpet (tracks 2, 5, 8, 9)
Geri Allen – piano (tracks 2, 5, 8-10)
James Genus – double bass (tracks 2, 5, 8, 9)
Drew Gress - double bass (tracks 1, 3, 4, 7, 11)
Eric Harland - drums (tracks 2, 5, 8, 9)
Joe Lovano - liner notes, mixing, production, tenor saxophone (tracks 9-10)
Luis Perdomo - piano (tracks 1, 3, 4, 7, 11)
E. J. Strickland – drums (tracks 1, 3, 4, 6, 7, 11)

Additional personnel
Chris Allen – engineering, mixing
Darlene DeVita – photography
Steve Genewick – mixing
Dave Kowalski – engineering
Bruce Lundvall – executive production
Joe Marciano – engineering
Hayden Miller – art direction, design
Allan Tucker – mastering

References

2012 albums
Albums produced by Joe Lovano
Blue Note Records albums
Instrumental albums
Ravi Coltrane albums
Avant-garde jazz albums